Blutch, pen name of Christian Hincker (born 27 December 1967 in Strasbourg) is a French comic book author. He is considered one of the main authors of French comics since the early 1990s.

Biography 

After studying at the École supérieure des arts décoratifs de Strasbourg, Blutch was discovered through a competition organized by the monthly magazine Fluide Glacial. He got his nickname from a classmate for his physical resemblance to Corporal Blutch, one of the characters of the comic series Les Tuniques Bleues.

His first strips appeared in Fluide Glacial between 1988 and 1993 (Pecos Jim, Waldo's Bar, Mademoiselle Sunnymoon).  From 1993 he was part of the circle of cartoonists working for the independent comic book publisher L’Association.  In 1996 he joined A Suivre magazine, where he designed the historical Péplum series.  Rancho Bravo (with Jean-Louis Capron) and Blotch (two issues), a satirical portrait of Fluide Glacial magazine and its illustrators, appeared in the late 1990s.  He underlined his versatility with the two-volume autobiography about his childhood in Le petit Christian (1998/2008) or with the comic novels Vitesse Moderne (2002) and La Volupté (2006).

In 2002, Blutch received the Prix international de la Ville de Genève pour la bande dessinée for Vitesse Moderne, and in 2009 the Grand Prix de la Ville d’Angoulême: that made Blutch president of the Angoulême comic festival in 2010.

Awards 

 2000 : Alph-Art humour at the  festival d'Angoulême for Blotch.
 2000 : Prix Jacques-Lob .
 2002 : Prix Töpffer international for Vitesse Moderne.
 2009 : grand prix de la ville d'Angoulême.
 2009 : « Essentiel » d'Angoulême forn Le Petit Christian tome 2.
 2017 : prix Wolinksi de la BD du Point for  Variations.
 2019 : Keys to the City of Strasbourg.

Selected publications 
1996-1999- Mitchum
1997 - Peplum (first serialized in A Suivre magazine)
2000 - Blotch (first serialized in Fluide Glacial)
2002 - Vitesse Moderne (Modern Speed)
2004 - Total Jazz
2006 - La Volupté

References

External links
Blutch profile on Lambiek Comiclopedia
Blutch profile on Europe Comics
Blutch interviewed by Paul Gravett, April 2016
Blutch interviewed by Craig Thompson interviews Blutch. Boing Boing, 19 April 2013

Living people
1967 births
Writers from Strasbourg
20th-century pseudonymous writers
21st-century pseudonymous writers
Charlie Hebdo people
French comics writers
French cartoonists